Negative atheism, also called weak atheism and soft atheism, is any type of atheism where a person does not believe in the existence of any deities but does not necessarily explicitly assert that there are none. Positive atheism, also called strong atheism and hard atheism, is the form of atheism that additionally asserts that no deities exist. Sometimes positive atheism goes by the term gnostic atheism to contrast with agnostic atheism, which is more correlated with weak atheism, and to stand opposite Gnostic theism on simple charts mapping different belief systems.

The terms "negative atheism" and "positive atheism" were used by Antony Flew in 1976 and have appeared in George H. Smith's and Michael Martin's writings since 1990.

Scope of application
Because of flexibility in the term god, it is possible that a person could be a positive/strong atheist in terms of certain conceptions of God, while remaining a negative/weak atheist in terms of others. For example, the God of classical theism is often considered to be a personal supreme being who is omnipotent, omniscient, omnipresent, and omnibenevolent, caring about humans and human affairs. One might be a positive atheist for such a deity, while being a negative atheist with respect to a deistic conception of God by rejecting belief in such a deity but not explicitly asserting it to be false.

Positive and negative atheism are frequently used by the philosopher George H. Smith as synonyms of the less-well-known categories of implicit and explicit atheism, also relating to whether an individual holds a specific view that gods do not exist.  "Positive" atheists explicitly assert that it is false that any deities exist. "Negative" atheists assert they do not believe any deities exist, but do not necessarily explicitly assert it is true that no deity exists. Those who do not believe any deities exist, but do not assert such non-belief, are included among implicit atheists. Among "implicit" atheists are thus included the following: children and adults who have never heard of deities; people who have heard of deities but have never given the idea any considerable thought; and those agnostics who suspend belief about deities, but do not reject such belief. All implicit atheists are included in the negative/weak categorization.

Under the negative atheism classification, agnostics are atheists. The validity of this categorization is disputed, however, and a few prominent atheists such as Richard Dawkins avoid it. In The God Delusion, Dawkins describes people for whom the probability of the existence of God is between "very high" and "very low" as "agnostic" and reserves the term "strong atheist" for those who claim to know there is no God. He categorizes himself as a "de facto atheist" but not a "strong atheist" on this scale.  Within negative atheism, philosopher Anthony Kenny further distinguishes between agnostics, who find the claim "God exists" uncertain, and theological noncognitivists, who consider all talk of gods to be meaningless.

Alternative meanings
Jacques Maritain used the negative/positive phrases as early as 1949, but with a different meaning and in the context of a strictly Catholic apologist.

Goparaju Ramachandra Rao (1902–1975), better known by his nickname Gora, was an Indian social reformer, anti-caste activist, and atheist. He proposed a philosophy he called "positive atheism", which treated atheism as a way of life in his 1972 book, Positive Atheism.

Similarly, the Atheist Community of Austin (ACA) uses the term positive atheism in the sense of putting a positive face to atheism and dispelling the false and negative image of atheism portrayed by religious people, especially in places of worship. Positive Atheism Magazine "sees atheism as being a positive, healthy outlook -- much healthier than any theistic approach to life."

Agnostics are not always merely implicit atheists. For instance, Philip Pullman, the English author of the His Dark Materials fantasy trilogy, which has atheism as a major theme, is an explicit atheist, but also describes himself as technically an agnostic.

See also
Antitheism
Ignosticism
Nontheism

References 

Atheism
Philosophy of religion

es:Ateísmo débil